Motuareronui / Adele Island is a small island off the coast of New Zealand. It is contained within Abel Tasman National Park. The navigator and botanist Dumont d'Urville charted the island in 1827.

In the 1850s, the island and nearby Fisherman Island were purchased by a Nelson custom collectors, but were later confiscated by the government due to misuse of funds. Both islands became scenic reserves in 1895.

These islands shelter the waterway known as the Astrolabe Roadstead from Tasman Bay / Te Tai-o-Aorere, making it popular with kayakers and boaties.

Etymology 
Dumont d'Urville named the island after his wife  Adele Pepin, and also named the adjacent Fisherman Island, along with the Astrolabe Roadstead, which he named after his ship.

In August 2014, the island name was officially altered to Motuareronui / Adele Island. Motu means island, arero is a tongue and nui is big; hence, Motuareronui literally means the big island shaped like a tongue, which makes Motuareroiti / Fisherman Island (with iti meaning little) the little island shaped like a tongue; however, in his comprehensive book on natural and cultural history of Abel Tasman National Park, Philip Simpson suggests the two islands are incorrectly named, as follows:

References

Abel Tasman National Park
Islands of the Tasman District
Tasman Bay